Rachel Steinman Clarke (c. 1882 – November 4, 1944) was a Polish-born American violinist based in Chicago.

Early life 
Rachel Steinman was born in Włocławek, Poland. Her family moved to the United States when Steinman was a child, and she was raised in Des Moines, Iowa, where she graduated from the Highland Park Conservatory of Music. She pursued further violin studies in Chicago and New York, and with Jacques Thibaud in Paris. Her sister Gertrude married actor Raymond Walburn.

Career 
Rachel Steinman was playing violin at Iowa events by 1900.  She toured on the Chautauqua and lyceum circuits with the Midland Concert Company as a young woman, and as head of the Rachel Steinman Concert Company. She toured with her husband in the Edward Clarke Concert Company, from the 1910s into the 1920s. In 1917, for example, the Clarke company gave 142 concerts in 71 cities in 70 days, driving Clarke's Ford over 4,500 miles through Illinois, Iowa, Minnesota, and Wisconsin in the process.

Clarke was a member of the Chicago Civic Symphony Orchestra, and on the faculty of the Lyceum Arts Conservatory of Chicago.  She also performed for radio concerts. "Miss Steinman is an exceedingly artistic violinist, playing with perfect self composure and so easily and gracefully as to inspire confidence in her music," commented one Iowa reviewer in 1911.

After moving to Florida in 1935, she was a member of the University of Miami Symphony Orchestra.

Personal life 
In 1913, Rachel Steinman married Charles Edward Clarke, a Canadian baritone singer, at a Baptist church in Chicago. She died in Miami, Florida in 1944.

References 

1880s births
1944 deaths
Year of birth uncertain
American classical violinists
Women classical violinists
Polish emigrants to the United States
People from Włocławek
Musicians from Des Moines, Iowa
Musicians from Chicago
20th-century American women musicians
20th-century classical violinists
Classical musicians from Iowa
Classical musicians from Illinois
20th-century American violinists